The Canadian Mathematical Olympiad (CMO) is Canada's top mathematical problem-solving competition. It is run by the Canadian Mathematical Society. The Olympiad plays several roles in Canadian mathematics competitions, most notably being Canada's main team selection process for the International Mathematical Olympiad.

Qualification
Approximately 70 to 80 people qualify for and are invited to write the CMO each year.  Students must not have written the Putnam Competition and must meet age, full-time school enrollment, and Canadian Citizenship (or permanent residency) requirements.  Students do not have to be living in Canada, as long as they are Canadian citizens.

Participants are invited to write the CMO usually because of excellent results at the Canadian Open Mathematics Challenge (COMC). Approximately the top 50 students from the COMC earn invitations to the CMO.  A Qualifying Repêchage (CMOQR) is offered as a "second chance" for the next highest 50 - 75 students from the COMC.  Approximately 20-25 students are chosen from the Repêchage and are then invited to the CMO.

Top students in certain other top Canadian competitions may also be considered for invitations.  The organizing committee may also invite participants based on their earlier CMO experience or their performance at APMO or USAMO competitions.

Competition Layout
The competition is three hours long.
There are five questions on the CMO, each worth seven marks, for a total of 35 points. Each problem is graded the same way as it is on the IMO.

From 1969 to 1972, the CMO was ten questions long. In the 1970s, the exam length changed a number of times before finally stabilizing to five questions in 1979.

The CMS does not formally disclose its marking procedure, however in the past the following model was used:
Two graders grade the questions. If there is a dispute between the graders by more than one point, they will reconsider the problem until a consensus is reached.
If no work was done or very insignificant progress was made, the answer is graded zero.
If significant progress is made, marks of 1, 2, or 3 will be given, depending on the amount progress toward solving the problem.
Marks of 4 or 5 are given for answers that are essentially correct, but are poorly presented or lack showing of work in some areas.
If the solution has a minor error that can be trivially fixed, it is given a 6.
An absolutely perfect solution is awarded a mark of 7. This might be given if there is an error in the writing that does not affect the solution in any meaningful way.

Awards
There are several different types of rewards for doing well on the CMO:

Six to eight of the top CMO participants are selected each year for Math Team Canada They are trained and sent to represent Canada at the International Mathematical Olympiad, the pinnacle of high school mathematical competition. 
For students who write in Canada, cash prizes are awarded to the top performers.  If there are no "ties", then $2000 goes to 1st place, $1500 to 2nd, $1000 to 3rd, and $500 for Honourable Mention (typically there are up to six people receiving Honourable Mention). When there are ties, prize money is pooled upwards (e.g. a tie for first means the co-winners share $3500 and no one gets "2nd").
The top student in Canada is recognized as the CMO Champion and his or her name is engraved on the CMO Championship Cup.
Top students are identified on the official web site to certify their high performance

Winners

See also
Canadian Open Mathematics Challenge
International Mathematical Olympiad
List of mathematics competitions

References

Mathematics competitions